The Council of Constantinople or Council of Blachernae was an Eastern Orthodox council, convened in 1285 in the Blachernae Palace in Constantinople. Under the presidency of the Patriarch of Constantinople, Gregory II, the Greek Orthodox Patriarch of Alexandria Athanasius III, and Emperor Andronikos II Palaiologos, the council repudiated the Union of the Churches under the Council of Lyons (1274), and condemned the pro-Unionist patriarch John XI Bekkos.

References

Sources
 
 
 

13th-century church councils
Eastern Orthodox Church councils
Church councils in Constantinople
1280s in the Byzantine Empire
East–West Schism
1285 in Europe
1285 in Christianity
Christianity and government
Society of the Byzantine Empire
Ecumenical Patriarchate of Constantinople